Tischeria pulvella is a moth of the  family Tischeriidae. It was identified and described in Texas, United States, in 1878 by Vactor Tousey Chambers.

References

Tischeriidae
Moths described in 1878